Leptarctia is a monotypic tiger moth genus in the family Erebidae described by Stretch in 1872. Its only species, Leptarctia californiae, was described by Francis Walker in 1855. It is found in western North America, from New Mexico and Colorado to California and north to British Columbia. The habitat consists of open forests, meadows and clearings in the mountains.

The length of the forewings is 12–17 mm. The forewings are dark gray with darker gray transverse lines and variable amounts of lighter cream patches. The hindwings are variable, but usually bright orange. Other variants range from nearly white to deep red or entirely black. Adults are on wing in spring with most records from March to July.

The larvae feed on various herbaceous plants.

Forms
There are two described forms:
Leptarctia californiae f. decia Boisduval, 1869
Leptarctia californiae f. dimidiata Stretch, 1872

Former species
Leptarctia albiceps Rothschild, 1933

References

Spilosomina
Moths described in 1855
Monotypic moth genera